Bitme (stylized as bitMe) is a Latin American subscription television channel, of Mexican origin, owned by TelevisaUnivision. It was launched on July 15, 2019, replacing the Tiin channel.

History 
The channel's project began in 2018, when Televisa Networks proposed a new channel focused on gamer programming and geek culture, after the low audience rating of its predecessor Tiin to attract the attention of young audiences. Bitme was launched on July 15, 2019, replacing the channel Tiin.

References

External links
 Official website

Television networks in Mexico
Televisa pay television networks
2019 in Mexican television
2019 establishments in Mexico